Raman railway station is a railway station located in Kayu Boko Subdistrict, Raman District, Yala.

Bombings 
On 2 October 2010, a 10 kg bomb hidden in a motorcycle blew up in front of Raman railway station. As a result, four people were injured all together, with two policemen seriously injured. Victims were sent to Raman Hospital and Yala Central Hospital afterward. The event was part of the South Thailand insurgency.

Services 
 Rapid No. 171/172 Bangkok-Sungai Kolok-Bangkok.
 Rapid No. 175/176 Hat Yai Junction-Sungai Kolok-Hat Yai Junction.
 Local No. 447/448 Surat Thani-Sungai Kolok-Surat Thani.
 Local No. 451/452 Nakhon Si Thammarat-Sungai Kolok-Nakhon Si Thammarat.
 Local No. 453/454 Yala-Sungai Kolok-Yala.
 Local No. 463/464 Phatthalung-Sungai Kolok-Phatthalung.

References 

 
 

Railway stations in Thailand